The Lucky Diamond is a 1933 Italian "white-telephones" comedy film directed by Carl Boese and starring Vittorio De Sica.

Cast
 Elsa Merlini - Lisetta
 Renato Cialente
 Vittorio De Sica
 Memo Benassi
 Gianfranco Giachetti

References

External links

1933 films
Italian comedy films
1930s Italian-language films
1933 comedy films
Italian black-and-white films
Films directed by Carl Boese
Italian multilingual films
1933 multilingual films
1930s Italian films